Henry Jenkins is a media scholar at USC.

Henry Jenkins may also refer to:

 Henry Jenkins (extreme longevity claimant) (died 1670), English supercentenarian claimant
 Henry Jenkins (MP) for Boroughbridge
 Henry Jenkins (Australian politician)

See also
 Harry Jenkins (disambiguation)
 Henry Jenkin, engineering professor